Lyth may refer to:

In people
 Robin Lyth Hudson (born 1940), British mathematician
 Adam Lyth (born 1987), English Test cricketer
 David H. Lyth, researcher in particle cosmology
 Isabel Menzies Lyth (1917–2008), British psychoanalyst 
 John Lyth (1821–1886), English Wesleyan Methodist preacher, author, historian and hymn writer
 Mary Ann Lyth (1811-1890), English missionary, translator, and teacher

In other
 Crosthwaite and Lyth, civil parish in the South Lakeland district of Cumbria, England
 Lyth Hill Countryside Site, Shropshire
 Lyth Valley, on the edge of the Lake District National Park in Cumbria, England